The 1996–97 Southwest Texas State Bobcats men's basketball team represented Southwest Texas State University in the 1996–97 NCAA Division I men's basketball season. The Bobcats, led by head coach Mike Miller, played their home games at Strahan Arena in San Marcos, Texas as members of the Southland Conference.

The Bobcats finished atop the regular season conference standings, won the Southland tournament, and received an automatic bid to the NCAA tournament. As No. 16 seed in the Midwest region, Southwest Texas State was beaten by No. 1 seed and eventual Final Four participant Minnesota, 78–46.

Roster

Schedule and results

|-
!colspan=12 style=| Regular season

|-
!colspan=12 style=| Southland tournament

|-
!colspan=12 style=| NCAA tournament

Source

References

Texas State Bobcats men's basketball seasons
Southwest Texas State Bobcats
Southwest Texas State
Texas State Bobcats men's basketball
Texas State Bobcats men's basketball